Xiaqiao may refer to:

 Xiaqiao, Yingshang County (夏桥镇), town in Anhui, China
 Xiaqiao, Xuwen County (下桥镇), town in Guangdong, China